Simon Porter may refer to:
Simon Porter (cricketer), English cricketer
Simon Porter (MP), member of parliament for Reading, and also mayor
Simon Porter (gymnast), competed in Artistic gymnastics at the 2011 Canada Winter Games